The Honda Spocket was a concept car developed by Honda that was displayed at auto shows in 1999 and 2000 but did not enter production.  

The Spocket was a convertible with the rear half of the car able to be used for a second row of seats or as a flat floor storage area. It was designed by Honda's California studio, and had a hybrid powertrain with the front wheel driven by a gas engine and the rear wheel by electric motors.

Honda showed the concept at the 1999 Tokyo Motor Show, the 2000 North American International Auto Show, and the 2000 LA Auto Show, though it did not go into production.

References

External links
Moss Bros Honda Website

Honda concept vehicles